Chaleh Polarz (also Romanized as Chāleh Polarz) is a village in Daland Rural District, in the Central District of Ramian County, Golestan Province, Iran. At the 2006 census, its population was 222, in 56 families.

References 

Populated places in Ramian County